Licchavi can refer to two historic states in South Asia:
Licchavi (tribe), lasted until the 4th century BCE
Licchavi (kingdom), ruled Nepal beginning in the 4th century CE